Eustorgio Sánchez (born January 23, 1959) is a retired Venezuelan football goalkeeper. He competed for his native South American country at the 1980 Summer Olympics in Moscow, Soviet Union, where the Men's National Team was eliminated after the preliminary round. Sánchez played for Deportivo Italia.

References

 sports-reference

1959 births
Living people
Association football goalkeepers
Venezuelan footballers
Deportivo Italia players
Footballers at the 1980 Summer Olympics
Olympic footballers of Venezuela